The 1943 Detroit Lions season was the franchise's 14th season in the National Football League. The team finished at 3–6–1, an improvement on their previous season's output of 0–11. They failed to qualify for the playoffs for the eighth consecutive season. Their 0–0 tie with the New York Giants in week 8 was the last scoreless tie in the NFL as of the end of the 2021 NFL season.

Schedule

Standings

Video
You Tube – Detroit Lions at Washington Redskins – (color, no audio) – November 14, 1943

References

External links
1943 Detroit Lions at Pro Football Reference
1943 Detroit Lions at jt-sw.com
1943 Detroit Lions at The Football Database

Detroit Lions seasons
Detroit Lions
Detroit Lions